Sire Ma (born 31 July 1987), or Ma Choi, is a Chinese actress based in Hong Kong. Her birth name is Sima Saier. She was the 2nd runner up at the Miss Hong Kong Pageant 2008, simultaneously winning the Miss Photogenic Award. She later went on to participate in the Miss International 2008, but was unplaced. She graduated from Hong Kong Baptist University. She left TVB around 2015 but remains active in mainland China in small roles on television and film.

Ma announced that she was married in early 2019 and gave birth to a girl in June 2019 named Camellia.

Filmography

Film

Television dramas

References

Sources
Miss Hong Kong Pageant 2008 Official Website
Sire Ma - contestant bio
Gallery - contestant images

External links
Sire Ma - TVB Blog

|-
! colspan="3" style="background: #DAA520;" | TVB Anniversary Awards
|-

1987 births
Living people
Actresses from Chongqing
Miss International 2008 delegates
TVB actors
Hong Kong beauty pageant winners
21st-century Hong Kong actresses
Alumni of Hong Kong Baptist University
Hong Kong film actresses
Hong Kong television actresses
21st-century Chinese actresses